Dragomir Draganov (born 27 September 1981) is a Bulgarian footballer.

References

1981 births
Living people
Bulgarian footballers
Association football forwards
Expatriate footballers in Albania
Bulgarian expatriate sportspeople in Albania
Bulgarian expatriate sportspeople in Sweden
Bulgarian expatriate footballers
Flamurtari Vlorë players
Kategoria Superiore players